Quaranjavirus johnstonense is the type virus of the Quaranjavirus genus in the virus family Orthomyxoviridae. The virus was first isolated in 1964 from ticks found in a Noddy Tern nest on Sand Island, Johnston Atoll. The discovery of the virus was notable as the only other species in the genus at the time had been previously discovered in Africa. Mainly concentrated in the pacific the range of this virus includes Johnson Atoll, and New Zealand.

References 

Orthomyxoviridae